Nimble Quest was a combination of an action RPG and the classic Snake concept released for iOS and Android by NimbleBit on March 28, 2013. On April 2, the game reached one million downloads. The game was released on Steam on December 6, 2013 as a paid version. The player moves around and kills enemies using a combination of ranged attacks or melee attacks depending on the character. Once enough enemies are killed, the player advances to the next level. If the player hits a wall or an enemy, or runs out of health, the game ends.

The game no longer functions on the iPad after upgrading to iOS 11.  NimbleBit's website stated (on Sept 21, 2017) "Nimble Quest is not supported on devices running iOS 11. We do not plan to update Nimble Quest at this time though we may decide to revive it in the future."

Characters 
The game has 16 main characters called "heroes" to play as. The player unlocks these heroes by beating a level. Heroes can be added to the "snake" when they are randomly dropped from an enemy the player killed. The player starts out with 3 characters.

Reception 
The game has received mostly positive reviews. It is rated 4.5 stars out of 5 on the App Store, where it received Editor's Choice upon its release. Gamezebo's 4.5 star review described it as "seriously potent fun." Gamezebo's 4.5 star review described it as "seriously potent fun." Forbes.com called it "an addictive little gem."

References

External links 
Nimble Quest on the US App Store
Touch Arcade exclusive Web Demo (requires Unity Web Player)

2013 video games
Action role-playing video games
Android (operating system) games
IOS games
NimbleBit games
Ouya games
Single-player video games
Snake video games
Video games developed in the United States